Peter Littelmann (born 10 December 1957) is a German mathematician at the University of Cologne working on algebraic groups and representation theory, who introduced the Littelmann path model and used it to solve several conjectures in standard monomial theory and other areas.

References

Home page

External links
Pictures from the Oberwolfach photo collection

20th-century German mathematicians
Living people
21st-century German mathematicians
1957 births